Jan Ceulemans (born 11 January 1926) is a Belgian former basketball player. He competed in the men's tournament at the 1952 Summer Olympics.

References

External links
 

1926 births
Living people
Belgian men's basketball players
Olympic basketball players of Belgium
Basketball players at the 1952 Summer Olympics
People from Vilvoorde
Sportspeople from Flemish Brabant